The 1998 Amber Valley Borough Council election took place on 7 May 1998 to elect members of Amber Valley Borough Council in Derbyshire, England. One third of the council was up for election and the Labour party kept overall control of the council.

After the election, the composition of the council was
Labour 37
Conservative 6

Election result

References

1998
1998 English local elections
1990s in Derbyshire